Tanout Airport (ICAO: DRZT) is an airport serving Tanout in Niger.

References

Airports in Niger